The Marvel was an automobile built at 284–290 Rivard Street, Detroit, Michigan, United States, by the Marvel Motor Car Company in 1907.

Marvel Motor Car Company purchased the Paragon factory and began building their own runabout. The Marvel was a two-seat runabout with a horizontal two-cylinder 14-hp engine, a planetary transmission and single chain drive. Price was set at $800,.

The company lost its factory space and ended production. The car became the Crescent in 1908.

References

Motor vehicle manufacturers based in Michigan
Defunct motor vehicle manufacturers of the United States
Cars introduced in 1907
Vehicle manufacturing companies established in 1907
Vehicle manufacturing companies disestablished in 1907
1907 establishments in Michigan
1907 disestablishments in Michigan
Defunct manufacturing companies based in Detroit
Brass Era vehicles
1900s cars